Sun Heidi Sæbø (born 2 July 1980) is a Norwegian journalist, newspaper editor and non-fiction writer. Since 2020 she is editor-in-chief of Morgenbladet.

Early and personal life
Born in South Korea on 2 July 1980, Sæbø studied comparative politics at the University of Bergen. She has also studied at the University of Shanghai.

Career
From 2005 to 2019 Sæbø was assigned to the newspaper Dagbladet, assuming various editorial positions. She was appointed societal editor at the newspaper Morgenbladet in 2019. In October 2019, the day after the resignment of Anna Børve Jenssen due to internal conflicts, Sæbø was temporaily assigned as chief editor of Morgenbladet, and from January 2020 she was appointed editor-in-chief and managing director of the newspaper.

Her books include Kims lek from 2015, a biography of Kim Jong-un from 2018, and Kina – den nye supermakten from 2019.

References

1980 births
Living people
South Korean emigrants to Norway
University of Bergen alumni
Dagbladet people
Norwegian newspaper editors
Norwegian women editors
Morgenbladet people
Norwegian non-fiction writers
Norwegian women non-fiction writers